The Ministry of Public Works and Transport, formerly the Transport Ministry is a government ministry of Algeria. Its head office is in El Biar, Algiers.

The Directorate of Civil Aviation and Meteorology (DACM) serves as the civil aviation authority and the authority for investigation of accidents and incidents.

The Direction of the Merchant Navy investigates maritime accidents and incidents.

There is also a commission of inquiry on rail accidents (administrative commission of inquiry into railway accidents and incidents).

Investigations of air accidents
 Air Algérie Flight 6289

References

External links

 Ministry of Public Works and Transport 

Government of Algeria
Alg
Organizations investigating aviation accidents and incidents
Algeria
Rail accident investigators
Transport organisations based in Algeria